Prahran railway station (/pɛ'ræn) is located on the Sandringham line in Victoria, Australia. It serves the south-eastern Melbourne suburb of Prahran, and opened on 22 December 1860 as Greville Street. It was renamed Prahran on 1 January 1867.

History
Prahran station opened on 22 December 1860, when the railway line from South Yarra was extended to Windsor. Like the suburb itself, the station was named from the Indigenous word ‘purraran’, believed to mean ‘almost surrounded by water’.

In 1962, boom barriers replaced interlocked gates at the Greville Street level crossing, located at the Up end of the station. The signal box that protected the level crossing was also abolished during that time.

In October 1979, automatic semaphore signals were replaced with light signals between Prahran and Windsor.

On 4 May 2010, as part of the 2010/2011 State Budget, $83.7 million was allocated to upgrade Prahran to a Premium Station, along with nineteen others. However, in March 2011, this was scrapped by the Baillieu Government.

Platforms and services
Prahran has two side platforms. It is served by Sandringham line trains.

Platform 1:
  all stations services to Flinders Street

Platform 2:
  all stations services to Sandringham

Transport links

Yarra Trams operates three routes via Prahran station:
 : Moreland station – Glen Iris
 : Melbourne University – Camberwell
 : North Richmond – Balaclava

References

External links
 Melway map at street-directory.com.au

Railway stations in Melbourne
Railway stations in Australia opened in 1860
Railway stations in the City of Stonnington